Betty Kizza (born 23 October 1996) is an Ugandan netball player who represents Uganda internationally and plays in the center position. She has represented Uganda at the 2018 Commonwealth Games and at the 2019 Netball World Cup.

In September 2019, she was included in the Ugandan squad for the 2019 African Netball Championships.

References 

1996 births
Living people
Ugandan netball players
Netball players at the 2018 Commonwealth Games
Commonwealth Games competitors for Uganda
2019 Netball World Cup players